Mycoleptodiscus is a genus of fungi in the family Magnaporthaceae.  These fungi are endophytic, meaning that they do not harm the host plant and are probably in a mutualistic relationship with it.

Species
Mycoleptodiscus affinis
Mycoleptodiscus atromaculans
Mycoleptodiscus brasiliensis
Mycoleptodiscus coloratus
Mycoleptodiscus disciformis
Mycoleptodiscus geniculatus
Mycoleptodiscus indicus
Mycoleptodiscus lateralis
Mycoleptodiscus lunatus
Mycoleptodiscus minimus
Mycoleptodiscus sphaericus
Mycoleptodiscus stellatisporus
Mycoleptodiscus taiwanensis
Mycoleptodiscus terrestris
Mycoleptodiscus unilateralis
Mycoleptodiscus variabilis

References

Magnaporthales
Sordariomycetes genera
Taxa described in 1968